Anum Qaisar, previously Anum Qaisar-Javed (born 11 September 1992) is a Scottish National Party (SNP) politician serving as the Member of Parliament (MP) for Airdrie and Shotts since  2021.

Early life 
Qaisar was born to a Scottish Pakistani family, and raised in Motherwell, where her parents were shopkeepers. Her grandfather had immigrated to Manchester in the 1960s.

She described her first experience of racism aged nine, when she was waiting at a bus stop after school on the day after the 11 September attacks in New York, her ninth birthday, and was asked, "Why is your skin colour the same colour as mud, as poo? Is your dad a terrorist?"

She studied politics at the University of Stirling and married a doctor.

Career

Born in Scotland and brought up in a Labour-supporting family, Qaisar  was an active member of Scottish Labour and became general secretary of Muslim Friends of Labour. She campaigned for a "Yes" vote in the 2014 Scottish independence referendum, and after that defeat she left Labour and joined the SNP.

Qaisar later worked a parliamentary researcher for Carol Monaghan MP, and as a case-worker for Scottish Justice Secretary Humza Yousaf.  

In 2015, Qasair unsuccessfully stood to be selected as the SNP candidate for Edinburgh Eastern at the 2016 Scottish Parliament Election, finishing second to eventual winner Ash Denham.

Before becoming an MP, she was a modern studies teacher at Boroughmuir High School and George Watson's College in Edinburgh, the latter where pupils' parents pay fees of up to £13,551 a year. She taught her students about why people from minority communities are under-represented in politics, such as a lack of role models.

In April 2021, Qaisar was selected as the SNP candidate for the 2021 Airdrie and Shotts by-election. The election was triggered by the resignation of the sitting SNP MP Neil Gray to stand in the May 2021 Scottish Parliament election.

On 14 May 2021, Qaisar won the election, becoming Scotland's second female Muslim MP after Tasmina Ahmed-Sheikh. Turnout was an unusually low 34.3%, and while Qaisar increased the SNP's share of the vote, her majority of 1,757 votes (8.0%) was lower than Neil Gray had won at the 2019 UK general election. After her victory, Qaisar pledged to be a role model for other minorities and to "fight for independence".

Parliament 
Qaisar took her seat in the House of Commons on 17 May. 

She made her maiden speech on 19 May. She complained that the House of Commons was more 'rowdy' than her former private school pupils, and reported being told by staff that the best way to navigate the building was to 'get lost'.  She ended on a serious note that in the current COVID-19 crisis the NHS had relied on migrant staff, criticising the UK's point-based immigration policy, which she said would even have excluded her own father (if it had been in place) and deprived the country of an MP, a doctor and a medical student (herself and her siblings).  
In a question session with Dominic Cummings on 26 May 2021, she asked if her former modern studies students were more aware of COVID-19 border control benefits than the Government. 

Following racist abuse of black English footballers, after the UEFA Euro 2020 Final, during Business Questions to the Leader of the House, Qaisar shared some of the racist abuse she had endured on social media in asking for an urgent debate on 'real action' to end racism in this country, so that "MPs of colour" can speak. Jacob Rees-Mogg the Leader said 'the House' sympathised but did not confirm a debate, directing his criticism at the social media. In November 2021, she questioned the value of the House of Lords 'an unelected crony-stuffed second chamber'. In December 2021, she was given a front bench role in trade.

See also
List of British Pakistanis
List of ethnic minority politicians in the United Kingdom
Scottish Asian

References

External links

1992 births
Living people
Female members of the Parliament of the United Kingdom for Scottish constituencies
Scottish National Party MPs
Scottish Muslims
People from Motherwell
Alumni of the University of Stirling
UK MPs 2019–present
Scottish schoolteachers
Scottish people of Pakistani descent
British politicians of Pakistani descent
Labour Party (UK) people
Politicians from North Lanarkshire